Walt Conti (born April 14, 1959) is a special effects artist. He was nominated at the 73rd Academy Awards for his work on the film The Perfect Storm in the category of Best Visual Effects. He shared his nomination with Stefen Fangmeier, John Frazier and Habib Zargarpour.

Selected filmography

 Star Trek IV: The Voyage Home (1986)
 Innerspace (1987)
 The Abyss (1989)
 Maverick (1994)
 White Squall (1996)
 Anaconda (1997)
 Deep Blue Sea (1999)
 Cast Away (2000)
 The Perfect Storm (2000)
 Austin Powers in Goldmember (2002)
 The Secret Life of Walter Mitty (2013)

References

External links

Living people
Special effects people
1959 births
Best Visual Effects BAFTA Award winners